KWBG (1590 AM) is a news/talk/sports-formatted broadcast radio station.  The station is licensed to Boone, Iowa and serves Boone and Story Counties in Iowa.  KWBG is owned and operated by Fieldview Broadcasting, LLC.

History
The station began broadcasting January 15, 1950, and ran 1,000 watts, during daytime hours only. It was originally owned by Boone Broadcasting Co. The following year, the station began nighttime operations, running 500 watts, utilizing a directional array. In the early 1970s, the station was sold to E. G. Wenrick and Kenneth Kilmer. In 1980, KWBG and its sister station KWBG-FM were sold to a group headed by general manager Dennis Borwick for $508,476. In 1986, KWBG and its FM sister station were sold to KZBA, Inc. for $606,344. In 1989, the station was sold to G.O. Radio, Inc. for $400,000.

In 1993, the station's format was changed from adult contemporary to country music. By the late 1990s, the station was airing a farm news-talk format. In 1999, the station was sold to Waitt Radio. Fieldview Broadcasting took ownership of KWBG in 2018. In 2019, KWBG received the National Association of Broadcasters' Crystal Award.

References

External links
 KWBG AM 1590 Online
 

1950 establishments in Iowa
News and talk radio stations in the United States
Sports radio stations in the United States
Radio stations established in 1950
WBG